Bartunek or Bartůněk is a surname of Czech origin. Notable people with the surname include:

Allen J. Bartunek (1928–1997), American politician
Jan Bartůněk (born 1965), Czechoslovak sprint canoer
Jean M. Bartunek (born 1944), American management scientist

References

Surnames of Czech origin